Truckin' Turtles is a supplement for the Teenage Mutant Ninja Turtles & Other Strangeness role-playing game. It was published by Palladium Books in 1989 and uses the Palladium Megaversal system.

Publication history
Truckin' Turtles was written by Jape Trostle, with a cover by Kevin Long and illustrations by Tom Baxa, and was published by Palladium Books in 1990 as a 48-page book.

Contents
Truckin' Turtles is a road trip adventure composed of six linked scenarios set in locations across America featuring ninjas, mutant animals, supervillains, and Neo-Nazis.

Description
Truckin' Turtles is largely a collection of adventure concepts that take the players across the United States, from New York to Silicon Valley with various wide-ranging themes. It explains mutants and their societies outside of the setting of the original rule book.

Reception
Truckin' Turtles was reviewed in Games Review Volume 2, Issue 5 - Feb 1990.

GM Magazine noted the compatibility of Truckin' Turtles with any Palladium role-playing game. The review praised well planned-out encounters, the random tables for traffic for traffic conditions and hostile encounters, and the quality of the illustrations.

Reviews
GamesMaster International Issue 1 - Aug 1990

References

1989 books
Teenage Mutant Ninja Turtles & Other Strangeness